Daniel Brinkmann (born 29 January 1986) is a German football coach and former player who coaches SC Wiedenbrück. He was a youth international for Germany.

References

External links
 
 
 

1986 births
Living people
People from Lippe
Sportspeople from Detmold (region)
German footballers
Association football midfielders
Footballers from North Rhine-Westphalia
Germany youth international footballers
Germany under-21 international footballers
SC Paderborn 07 players
Alemannia Aachen players
FC Augsburg players
FC Energie Cottbus players
Arminia Bielefeld players
SC Wiedenbrück 2000 players
Bundesliga players
2. Bundesliga players
3. Liga players
21st-century German people